Sunrise Over a Sea of Blood is the second album from the Christian Deathcore band Mortal Treason. It is the first album to feature bassist TJ Alford, pianist Elizabeth Kimbrough, drummer Steve Robinson, and rhythm guitarist Adam Wright.

Track listing
"Best Case Scenario" – 1:42
"Worst Case Scenario" – 3:21
"Dig Your Own Grave" – 3:58
"Abaddon" – 3:26
"The Falling" – 3:59
"Sunrise Over A Sea Of Blood" – 5:08
"Taste Of A Bitter Soul" – 3:39
"These Evil Days" – 3:17
"One Hour From Forever" – 4:13
"Death Is The Beginning" – 8:16

Music style
On the Mortal Treason MySpace page they describe who has influenced them for this album.

As indicated by the album's title, Sunrise Over a Sea of Blood covers serious and weighty issues. The title track, according to Kimbrough, "talks about the end times and how the world is going crazy." "Most of the lyrics are about spiritual things that we go through ," he says. These songs provide an outlet through which Mortal Treason addresses tough topics the band encounters on a daily basis. One melody builds off another, telling a story, reaching a conclusion, and the ending isn't always happy.

Song meanings
The opening record is "Worst Case Scenario", a song about friends falling into drugs and other worldly evils, while "Abaddon" speaks specifically to child abuse, offering a word of hope. Other songs like "The Falling" and "Dig Your Own Grave" explore the repercussions of living life for oneself.

Personnel
Mortal Treason
 Seth Kimbrough – vocals
 Elizabeth Kimbrough – keys
 Josh Jarrett – guitar
 Adam Wright – guitar
 TJ Alford – bass
 Steve Robinson – drums

Production
 Nathan Dantzler - Editing, Engineer, Mixing, Mastering, Producer
 Bob Herdman - Executive Producer
 Will McGinniss - Executive Producer
 John Williams & The Tick Tocks - Artwork, Layout Design

References

Mortal Treason albums
2005 albums
Flicker Records albums